Stachyose is a tetrasaccharide consisting of two α--galactose units, one α--glucose unit, and one β--fructose unit sequentially linked as gal(α1→6)gal(α1→6)glc(α1↔2β)fru. Together with related oligosaccharides such as raffinose, stachyose occurs naturally in numerous vegetables (e.g. green beans, soybeans and other beans) and other plants.  

Stachyose is less sweet than sucrose, at about 28% on a weight basis. It is mainly used as a bulk sweetener or for its functional oligosaccharide properties.  Stachyose is not completely digestible by humans and delivers 1.5 to 2.4 kcal/g (6 to 10 kJ/g).

References

External links
 ChemSub Online:Stachyose

Tetrasaccharides